Cage Without a Key is a 1975 American made-for-television drama film directed by Buzz Kulik and starring Susan Dey and Sam Bottoms, with Jonelle Allen and Lani O'Grady in supporting roles. The film premiered on the CBS television network the evening of March 14, 1975, later repeating at various times on The CBS Late Movie.  The film was released on VHS under the title Imprisoned Women.

Cage Without a Key was filmed at Las Palmas School for Girls in Commerce, California, now known as the Dorothy Kirby Center. It was a juvenile detention center, not an actual women's prison. Many of the extras were actual inmates.

Plot
17-year-old, Valerie Smith, newly graduated from high school, heads off on a road trip to San Francisco with her friend Joleen. They have just started out when Joleen's car breaks down, but one of Joleen's friends, Buddy (Sam Bottoms) pulls up and offers to take Valerie the rest of the way. He is overly familiar; Valerie does not know him and is reluctant to accept the offer, but is ultimately pressured into accepting the ride. Not far into the trip Buddy decides to rob a liquor store and forces Valerie to assist him at gunpoint. The shopkeeper raises the alarm and is shot dead; the police arrive and both Buddy and Valerie are arrested.

At her trial, Buddy insists that he and Valerie were secret lovers and that it was only at her urging that he committed the robbery. All the witnesses back his version that she was a willing participant, and she is duly convicted of the murder and sent to the San Marcos School for Girls.

It is a big modern prison campus and has modern facilities like a hair salon and its own modern euphemistic language, including the rebranding of solitary confinement as "meditation". The staff meanwhile eschew all modern correctional techniques, keeping the girls in their place by reinforcing their uselessness whenever possible, and failing to intervene in their most blatant acts of skulduggery.
The prisoners are divided into two rival camps - one led by the duplicitous, scheming Susie Kurosawa (Suesie Eléne), who is a favourite of the staff, and the other by the forthright Tommy Washington (Jonelle Allen).
Valerie knows she does not belong in this circle and tries to avoid taking sides, but after her 14-year-old friend Sarah has a vat of boiling water tipped over her by the Kurosawa gang, she decides that aligning herself to Tommy's crew might be in her best interests.
She continues to battle, aghast at the way the "school" is managed, and not fully comprehending that prison could be much, much worse. She becomes a bit manic.

Away from the prison, her attorney resorts to some very creative work to explode Buddy's story, but when he does it is almost in vain as Valerie prepares to join in on an escape attempt after suffering one tragedy, where Wanda dies from a blood clot, one unhappy setback too many, when a fight breaks out during a running exercise, and Valerie gets involved, trying to subdue Susie. However, when Tommy gets involved, Susie stabs her to death with a knife and Susie is taken away for murder.

References

External links

Columbia Pictures films
CBS network films
1975 television films
1975 films
American LGBT-related television films
Films directed by Buzz Kulik
1975 drama films
1975 LGBT-related films
1970s American films